Skyjet Airlines was a private airline in Uganda that provided civilian passenger and cargo commercial services. Established as a cargo airline in 2003, Skyjet Airlines started passenger services on February 1, 2009. The company headquarters are located in Kampala while the main base of operation is located at Entebbe International Airport. It halted operations on June 30, 2009.

Fleet
Skyjet Airlines has the following aircraft in its fleet, as of February 2009:

 two (2) Boeing 737-200

External links
  Skyjet Fleet
  Skyjet Website
  Photo of Skyjet B-737-232

References

Skyjet Airlines
Airlines established in 2003